SPSE can refer to:
Société du pipeline sud-européen, operator of a crude oil pipeline in France, Switzerland and Germany
Society of Photographic Scientists and Engineers, a former name for the Society for Imaging Science and Technology (IS&T)
Society of Professionals, Scientists and Engineers, union representing some University of California staff at the Lawrence Livermore National Laboratory
South Pacific Stock Exchange, a stock exchange based in Suva, Fiji
Southern Pump Services Engineering, pump manufacturer in Perivale, United Kingdom 
Syndicat du personnel de soutien en éducation, labour union that forms part of the Centrale des syndicats du Québec in Canada
Sistem Pengadaan Secara Elektronik, a nationwide Electronic Government Procurement System of Government of Indonesia
Stowarzyszenie Pasjonatów Sportów Elektronicznych, Polska organizacja pozarządowa, działająca w obszarze e-sportu.
SharePoint Server Subscription Edition, a Microsoft collaboration product.